HLA class I histocompatibility antigen, alpha chain E (HLA-E) also known as MHC class I antigen E is a protein that in humans is encoded by the HLA-E gene. The human HLA-E is a non-classical MHC class I molecule that is characterized by a limited polymorphism and a lower cell surface expression than its classical paralogues. The functional homolog in mice is called Qa-1b, officially known as H2-T23.

Structure 

Like other MHC class I molecules, HLA-E is a heterodimer consisting of an α heavy chain and a light chain (β-2 microglobulin). The heavy chain is approximately 45 kDa and anchored in the membrane. The HLA-E gene contains 8 exons. Exon one encodes the signal peptide, exons 2 and 3 encode the α1 and α2 domains, which both bind the peptide, exon 4 encodes the α3 domain, exon 5 encodes the transmembrane domain, and exons 6 and 7 encode the cytoplasmic tail.

Function 

HLA-E has a very specialized role in cell recognition by natural killer cells (NK cells). HLA-E binds a restricted subset of peptides derived from signal peptides of classical MHC class I molecules, namely HLA-A, B, C, G. These peptides are released from the membrane of the endoplasmic reticulum (ER) by the signal peptide peptidase and trimmed by the cytosolic proteasome. Upon transport into the ER lumen by the transporter associated with antigen processing (TAP), these peptides bind to a peptide binding groove on the HLA-E molecule. This allows HLA-E to assemble correctly and to be expressed on the cell surface. NK cells recognize the HLA-E+peptide complex using the heterodimeric receptor CD94/NKG2A/B/C. When CD94/NKG2A or CD94/NKG2B is engaged, it produces an inhibitory effect on the cytotoxic activity of the NK cell to prevent cell lysis. However, binding of HLA-E to CD94/NKG2C (see KLRC2) results in NK cell activation. This interaction has been shown to trigger expansion of NK cell subsets in antiviral responses, where adaptive NK cells that express CD94/NKG2C can specifically recognise HCMV-derived peptide antigens.

References

Further reading 

Kuby Immunology, 6th edition, by Thomas J. Kindt, Richard A. Goldsby, and Barbara A. Kuby W. H. Freeman and Company, New York